8-Bromotheophylline is a xanthine diuretic drug. It is the main active ingredient in pamabrom where it is sold as an over-the-counter medication in combination with paracetamol, among other analgesics, to treat dysmenorrhea. It is also an adenosine receptor A1 antagonist.

See also 
 8-Chlorotheophylline
 8-Cyclopentyltheophylline
 8-Phenyltheophylline

References 

Adenosine receptor antagonists
Xanthines
Diuretics